Louis J. Belton (born 30 November 1943) is a former Irish Fine Gael politician from County Longford, and the seventh member of the Belton family to be elected to the Oireachtas.

Formerly a building society employee, Belton was a  member of Longford County Council from 1985 to 1999. He  was first elected to Dáil Éireann at the 1989 general election as Teachta Dála (TD) for the Longford–Westmeath constituency, but lost his seat at the 1992 general election when contesting the revised Longford–Roscommon constituency. However, he was then elected to the 20th Seanad Éireann in 1993, when he topped the poll for the Administrative Panel. He regained his Dáil seat at the 1997 general election but lost it again at the 2002 general election to Mae Sexton of the Progressive Democrats. He did not contest the 2007 general election. His brother Paddy is a sitting county councillor and former Mayor of Longford.

See also
Families in the Oireachtas

References

1943 births
Living people
Fine Gael TDs
Members of the 26th Dáil
Members of the 20th Seanad
Members of the 28th Dáil
Local councillors in County Longford
Fine Gael senators
Belton family